Khoshknudhan or Khoshk Nowdahan or Khoshk Nowdehan or Khoshknowdehan may refer to:
 Khoshknudhan-e Bala
 Khoshknudhan-e Pain